Frederick Smyth may refer to:

Frederick Smyth (New Hampshire politician) (1819–1899), Governor of New Hampshire
Frederick Smyth (New York politician) (1832–1900), justice of the New York Supreme Court

See also
Frederick Smith (disambiguation)